Yr Aran is a mountain peak on a ridge radiating south from Snowdon, Wales' highest mountain, with beautiful views of the summit of Snowdon, Moel Hebog and the Nantlle Ridge.

Although no paths are marked on maps, the ascent is easily made as a detour from the Rhyd Ddu path or the Watkin Path up Snowdon.

External links
 www.geograph.co.uk : photos of Yr Aran and surrounding area

Beddgelert
Betws Garmon
Mountains and hills of Gwynedd
Mountains and hills of Snowdonia
Hewitts of Wales
Marilyns of Wales
Nuttalls